United Country Party may refer to:

United Country Party (Australia)
United Country Party (Kenya)
United Country Party (United Kingdom)
United Country Party of New South Wales